Little Ararat or Lesser Ararat also known as Mount Sis, is the sixth-tallest peak in Turkey. Despite being dwarfed by its higher and far more famous neighbor, Little Ararat is a significant volcano in its own right, with an almost perfectly symmetrical, conical form and smooth constructional slopes.

History
On , Baltic German explorer Friedrich Parrot and Armenian writer Khachatur Abovian climbed Little Ararat.  Its peak and eastern flank were on the Iranian side of the border until the early 1930s.  

During the Kurdish Ararat rebellion, Kurdish rebels used the area "as a haven against the state in their uprising."  Turkey crossed the border and militarily occupied the region, which Iran eventually agreed to cede to Ankara in a territorial exchange.

See also
 Mountains of Ararat

References

Citations

Sources 

 

Mountains of Turkey
Stratovolcanoes of Turkey
Landforms of Ağrı Province
Mountains of the Armenian Highlands
Mount Ararat
Three-thousanders of Turkey